Seyyedan (also Romanized as Seyyedān; also known as Saiyideh) is a village in Aghili-ye Jonubi Rural District, Aghili District, Gotvand County, Khuzestan Province, Iran. At the 2006 census, its population was 1,079, in 211 families.

References 

Populated places in Gotvand County